Liemeer is a former municipality in the western Netherlands, in the province of South Holland. It was merged into the municipality of Nieuwkoop on January 1, 2007.

The municipality covered an area of 30.98 km² of which 0.76 km² is water. Its population was 6962 in November 2006. Liemeer consisted of the communities of Nieuwveen, Noorden, Vrouwenakker, and Zevenhoven.

The former municipality of Liemeer was established as a renaming of Nieuwveen in 1994.

External links
 Official Liemeer website (in Dutch)
 Liemeer map

Municipalities of the Netherlands established in 1994
Municipalities of the Netherlands disestablished in 2007
Former municipalities of South Holland
Geography of Nieuwkoop